The World Group was the highest level of Davis Cup competition in 2015. The first-round losers went into the Davis Cup World Group Play-offs, and the winners progressed to the quarterfinals and World Group spot for 2016.

Participating teams

Seeds

Draw

First round

Germany vs. France

Great Britain vs. United States

 The Isner-Ward match was the longest match involving a United States player since the introduction of the tiebreaker in 1989.
 Great Britain's victory over the United States was their first win over this country at home since 1935.

Czech Republic vs. Australia

 This was Australia's first World Group win since 2006.

Kazakhstan vs. Italy

Argentina vs. Brazil

 The Mayer-Souza match set the record for the longest Davis Cup singles rubber, lasting for 6 hours and 42 minutes, eclipsing the previous record by 20 minutes which was from the McEnroe-Wilander match in 1982. It is the second longest tour match in history, behind the Isner-Mahut match from Wimbledon 2010.

Serbia vs. Croatia

Canada vs. Japan

Belgium vs. Switzerland

 Belgium won a World Group tie for the first time since 2007.

Quarterfinals

Great Britain vs. France

 Great Britain won a quarterfinal match for the first time since 1981.
 It is the first time since 1998 that siblings have combined to win three points in a world group tie. The Black brothers Byron and Wayne did so for Zimbabwe against Australia.

Australia vs. Kazakhstan

 It was the first time in 76 years that Australia had come back from 2–0 down to win.
 It was the first time that all four nominated players had played in a singles live rubber tie for Australia.
 Australia made it into the semifinals for the first time since 2006.
 Despite having played Davis Cup for 17 years it was the first time that Hewitt had played in the deciding rubber.

Argentina vs. Serbia

Belgium vs. Canada

 Belgium advanced to the semifinals for the first time since 1999.

Semifinals

Great Britain vs. Australia

Great Britain reach their first final since 1978.

Belgium vs. Argentina

Belgium reach their first final since 1904 and equal their best Davis Cup performance.

Final

Belgium vs. Great Britain

 Great Britain win their 10th Davis Cup and their first since 1936.
 Andy Murray becomes the third player to finish with an 8–0 record in the singles after John McEnroe and Mats Wilander.
 Andy Murray becomes the fourth player to finish with an 11–0 record in the singles and doubles.

References

World Group